Notagonum spinulum is a species of ground beetle in the subfamily Platyninae. It was described by Darlington in 1952.

References

Notagonum
Beetles described in 1952